The 1983–84 NBA season was the Spurs' eighth season in the NBA and 17th season as a franchise.

Draft picks

Roster

Regular season

Season standings

z - clinched division title
y - clinched division title
x - clinched playoff spot

Record vs. opponents

Game log

Player statistics

Awards and records

Transactions

References

See also
1983-84 NBA season

San Antonio Spurs seasons
San
San Antonio
San Antonio